Lyman Raion (translit.: Lymans'kyi raion; , translit.: Limanskiy raion) was a raion (district) within Donetsk Oblast in eastern Ukraine. Its administrative center was Lyman, which was separately incorporated as a city of oblast significance and did not belong to the district.

In 2016, Lyman Raion was abolished and merged into Lyman municipality (formerly Krasnyi Lyman United Territorial Community).

History
Before 1917, the raion was part of the Kharkov Governorate.

Until May 2016, raion was known as Krasnyi Lyman Raion. On 19 May 2016, Verkhovna Rada adopted a decision to rename Krasnyi Lyman Raion to Lyman Raion according to the law prohibiting names of Communist origin. Krasnyi Lyman was previously renamed to Lyman according to the same law.

Demographics
As of the 2001 Ukrainian census:

Ethnicity
 Ukrainians: 83.3%
 Russians: 15%

Environment
The national nature park Svyati Hory is 404.48 km² and it contains plant life from the region of the Seversky Donets River. The park contains over 1,008 different plants, almost 20% of them being endemic plants. Forty-six plants that grow here and 50 types of animals are entered into the Ukraine's Red Book of Rare Species. The fauna contains 43 types of mammals, 194 types of birds, 10 types of reptiles, 9 types of amphibians and 40 types of fish.

Another nature preserve is the Melova Flora. Known for its plant life, the preserve has an area of 11.34 km².

See also
 Administrative divisions of Donetsk Oblast

References

External links

  Verkhovna Rada website - Administrative divisions of the Krasnolymanskyi Raion

Former raions of Donetsk Oblast
States and territories disestablished in 2016
1944 establishments in Ukraine
2016 disestablishments in Ukraine